"Warnings Moving Clockwise" is a song by Australian rock/pop group Do-Re-Mi released by Virgin Records in November 1985 as the third and final single from their debut studio album. The song peaked at number 72 in Australia.

Track listing
All tracks were written by Deborah Conway, Dorland Bray, Helen Carter and Stephen Philip.
"Warnings Moving Clockwise" - 3:40
"Disneyland" (live) - 2:45
"Standing on Wires" (live) - 3:03

Charts

Personnel
Do-Ré-Mi members
Dorland Bray — drums, percussion, backing vocals
Helen Carter — bass guitar, backing vocals
Deborah Conway — lead vocalist
Stephen Philip — guitar
Additional musicians
Roger Freeman — trombone
Steve Hogarth — keyboards
Recording details
Producer, engineer — Gavin MacKillop
Assistant engineer — Chris Potter, Mike Bigwood, Steve Chase
Studio — Townhouse III Studios London
 Mixing studio — Maison Rouge Studios London, Genetic Studios Reading

References

1985 singles
Do-Re-Mi (band) songs
1985 songs
Virgin Records singles